Pascal Rogé (born 6 April 1951) is a French pianist.

His playing includes the works of compatriot composers Saint-Saëns, Fauré, Debussy, Ravel, Satie, and Poulenc, among others.  However, his repertoire also covers the German and Austrian masters Haydn, Mozart, Brahms, and Beethoven.

Biography 

Rogé first appearance in public was in 1960 with a performance of Claude Debussy's Préludes. He won the piano prize at the Paris Conservatory and worked for several years with Julius Katchen. At seventeen, he gave his first recitals in major European cities, landing an exclusive contract with Decca in the process. He has a particular affinity with French composers such as Claude Debussy, Gabriel Fauré, Maurice Ravel and Francis Poulenc. He also performs chamber works, with the Pasquier Trio, and with musicians such as Pierre Amoyal or Michel Portal, with whom he recorded Poulenc and Tchaikovsky. He gives recitals worldwide, in all the major centres. A friend of conductor Charles Dutoit, he was regularly invited to Canada to work with the Montreal Symphony Orchestra while Dutoit was conductor there.

In 2011 he and his wife Ami premiered the Concerto for Two Pianos by the Australian composer Matthew Hindson, which was commissioned to celebrate their recent wedding.

References

External links
Official website 

[ Biography from Allmusic]
Hear Pascal Rogé in concert from WGBH Boston

20th-century French male classical pianists
21st-century French male classical pianists
1951 births
Living people
Long-Thibaud-Crespin Competition prize-winners
Oehms Classics artists